Raudanjoki is a river in Rovaniemi, Finland. It is a tributary of Kemijoki in Finnish Lapland.

See also
List of rivers in Finland

Rivers of Finland
Kemijoki basin
Rivers of Rovaniemi